The Lone Rider in Frontier Fury is a 1941 American Western film directed by Sam Newfield. The film stars George Houston as the "Lone Rider" and Al St. John as his sidekick "Fuzzy" Jones, with Hillary Brooke, Karl Hackett, Ted Adams and Arch Hall Sr. The film was released on August 8, 1941, by Producers Releasing Corporation. The film is also known as Frontier Fury in the United Kingdom and Rangeland Racket (American reissue title).

This is the fourth movie in the "Lone Rider" series, which spans seventeen films—eleven starring George Houston, and a further six starring Robert Livingston.

Houston, once an opera singer, sang three songs in this film: "Down by the Old Alamo", "A Love That Faded Too Soon" and "Ride 'Em Cowboy". The songs were written by Johnny Lange and Lew Porter.

Cast 
George Houston as Tom Cameron, the Lone Rider
Al St. John as Fuzzy Q. Jones
Hillary Brooke as Georgia Deering
Karl Hackett as Matt Malone
Ted Adams as Case Murdock
Arch Hall Sr. as Clyde Barton
Budd Buster as "Loco" Weed - Ranch Hand
Virginia Card as Midge Malone
Edward Peil Sr. as Mr. Harper - Cattle Rancher
John Elliott as Rancher Jim Bowen
Tom London as Curley - Saloon Henchman
Frank Ellis as Joe - Saloon Henchman

See also
The "Lone Rider" films starring George Houston:
 The Lone Rider Rides On (1941)
 The Lone Rider Crosses the Rio (1941)
 The Lone Rider in Ghost Town (1941)
 The Lone Rider in Frontier Fury (1941)
 The Lone Rider Ambushed (1941)
 The Lone Rider Fights Back (1941)
 The Lone Rider and the Bandit (1942)
 The Lone Rider in Cheyenne (1942)
 The Lone Rider in Texas Justice (1942)
 Border Roundup (1942)
 Outlaws of Boulder Pass (1942)
starring Robert Livingston: 
 Overland Stagecoach (1942)
 Wild Horse Rustlers (1943)
 Death Rides the Plains (1943)
 Wolves of the Range (1943)
 Law of the Saddle (1943)
 Raiders of Red Gap (1943)

References

External links 

1941 films
1941 Western (genre) films
American black-and-white films
American Western (genre) films
Producers Releasing Corporation films
1940s English-language films
Films directed by Sam Newfield
1940s American films